Melbourne railway station was a station at Kings Newton that served the adjacent town of Melbourne, Derbyshire, England.

History
In 1874 it became a through station as the line was extended to a junction on the Leicester to Burton upon Trent Line near .

In 1930 passenger services were withdrawn and the Midland's successor, the London, Midland and Scottish Railway, was using the line only for freight services. During the Second World War the line became the Melbourne Military Railway and Melbourne station became its headquarters. In 1945 the War Department returned the line and station to the LMS.

In 1980 British Railways closed the line and by the 1990s the track had been dismantled. The trackbed through the former station is now part of National Cycle Route 6.

Stationmasters
Alexander McCall 1869 - 1875 (afterwards station master at Manton)
W. Blackshaw from 1875 - 1891 
G. Barker 1891 - 1898 (formerly station master at Cumwhinton, afterwards station master at Stoke Works)
John Henry Goodliffe 1898 - 1929 
William Arthur Ofield 1929 - 1935 (formerly station master at Weston on Trent)
J.W. Hardy 1936 - 1937 (afterwards station master at Shepshed)
Andrew McLennan 1937 - 1938 (formerly station master at East Ham, afterwards station master at Staveley, Westmorland)
A. Robinson 1938 - 1939 (afterwards station master at Worthington)

Route

References

Disused railway stations in Derbyshire
Former Midland Railway stations
Railway stations in Great Britain opened in 1868
Railway stations in Great Britain closed in 1930
Melbourne, Derbyshire